This is a list of Madhya Pradesh first-class cricket records, with each list containing the top five performances in the category.

Currently active players are bolded.

Team records

Highest innings totals

Lowest innings totals

Largest margin of runs victory

Largest margin of runs victory

Batting records

Highest individual scores

Most runs in a season

Bowling records

Best innings bowling

Best match bowling

Hat-Trick

Notes

All lists are referenced to CricketArchive.

See also

 Madhya Pradesh cricket team
 List of Madhya Pradesh List A cricket records

Cricket in Madhya Pradesh
Madhya Pradesh